The Canon EOS 2000D, known as the Rebel T7 in the Americas, as the Kiss X90 in Japan and as the 1500D in southeast Asia, is a 24.0 megapixels digital single-lens reflex camera (DSLR) made by Canon. It was announced on February 25, 2018 with a suggested retail price of US$549.99 including the EF-S 18-55 f/3.5-5.6 IS II lens.

The 2000D is an entry-level DSLR that supersedes the EOS 1300D. A key-added-feature was the introduction of the new 24.0 megapixels sensor.

Features

 24.0 effective megapixel APS-C CMOS sensor
 9 AF points with 1 cross-type point in the center at f/5.6, extra sensitivity at f/2.8 or faster (except when an EF 28-80mm f/2.8-4L USM lens or EF 50mm f/2.5 Compact Macro lens is attached)
 ISO sensitivity 100 – 6400 (expandable to H: 12800)
 1080p Full HD video recording at 24p, 25p (25 Hz) and 30p (29.97 Hz) with drop frame timing
 720p HD video recording at 60 fps (59.94 Hz) and 50 fps (50 Hz)
 3.0" in 4:3 ratio colour TFT LCD screen

Differences compared to the 1300D:
 24.0 megapixels sensor

References

External links

EOS Rebel T7 EF-S 18-55mm IS II Kit
Canon EOS Rebel T7 Product Manual (PDF)

Best Lens For Canon 2000D
2000D
Live-preview digital cameras
Cameras introduced in 2018